Wind River is a 2017 neo-Western crime film written and directed by Taylor Sheridan. The film stars Jeremy Renner and Elizabeth Olsen as a U.S. Fish and Wildlife Service tracker and an FBI agent, respectively, who try to solve a murder on the Wind River Indian Reservation in Wyoming. Gil Birmingham, Jon Bernthal, and Graham Greene also star.

Sheridan has said that he wrote the film to raise awareness of the issue of the high number of Indigenous women who are raped and murdered, both on and off reservations.

Wind River premiered at the 2017 Sundance Film Festival and was released in the United States on August 4, 2017. The film received generally positive reviews from critics and was a box office success, grossing $45 million against an $11 million budget. It was theatrically released by The Weinstein Company (TWC), but in October 2017, following the reporting of numerous sexual abuse allegations against Harvey Weinstein, the film's distribution rights for home media were acquired by Lionsgate. Weinstein's credits and logo were omitted on home media and streaming services, as TWC lost its distribution rights.

Plot 

During the winter on Wyoming's Wind River Indian Reservation, U.S. Fish and Wildlife Service Agent Cory Lambert discovers the frozen body of 18-year-old Natalie Hanson. FBI Special Agent Jane Banner arrives to investigate the possible homicide. Banner learns from Natalie's father, Martin, that his daughter was dating a new boyfriend whose name he does not know. 

Natalie's autopsy shows signs of blunt trauma and rape and confirms Lambert's deduction that Natalie died from pulmonary hemorrhage caused by inhaling subzero air. The medical examiner cannot classify the death as a homicide, so Banner cannot get additional help from her supervisors.

Lambert discovers that Natalie's boyfriend is Matt Rayburn, a security guard at a nearby oil-drilling site. Lambert and Banner soon find Matt's naked, mutilated body in the snow. Lambert reveals to Banner that his 16-year-old daughter Emily died in a similar manner to Natalie three years earlier, and the case remains unsolved.

Banner, tribal police Chief Ben Shoyo, and other law enforcement officers visit the drilling site, where Curtis, the security supervisor, and several security guards meet them. They claim Matt left a few days prior following an argument with Natalie. One guard mentions they heard about Natalie's body being found, and Banner states that Natalie's name has not been released to the public. The guards claim they learned it by monitoring a police scanner. One of Banner's team notices the guards slowly surrounding them and draws his weapon. The confrontation quickly escalates into an armed standoff which Banner defuses.

In a flashback, Matt's drunken colleagues barge into his trailer while he is in bed with Natalie. Matt is provoked to violence, and the other guards retaliate while Pete rapes Natalie. Matt is beaten to death, but his attempt to fight back allows Natalie to try to escape by running cross-country to the mobile home where her brother lives. 

In the present, Lambert traces the tracks from where Matt's corpse was found back to the drilling camp. As Banner and the others approach Pete's trailer, Lambert radios a warning to Shoyo. Pete responds to a veiled warning from Curtis by firing a shotgun through the door, wounding Banner. A gunfight ensues, and Shoyo and the other officers are killed. As the remaining guards prepare to execute Banner, Lambert kills four with his rifle. A wounded Pete flees on foot, but Lambert apprehends him. 

At Gannett Peak, Lambert forces Pete to confess before offering him the same chance Natalie had: try to stay alive by running to a distant road barefoot and wearing lightweight clothing. Pete runs but quickly succumbs as his lungs give out from the frigid air. Lambert visits Banner in the hospital and praises her toughness. He visits with Martin and they share grief over the deaths of their daughters. 

A title card states that missing persons statistics are kept for every demographic group except Native American women, whose numbers remain unknown.

Cast

Production
According to Sheridan, he was inspired to write this film because he learned about the "thousands of actual stories just like it": referring to the high number of Indigenous women who are victims of sexual assault and/or murder. He wrote and directed the movie to make more people aware of this problem.

The film is the third installment of Taylor Sheridan's trilogy of "the modern-day American frontier", the first being Sicario in 2015, and Hell or High Water the next year. Principal photography on the film began on March 12, 2016, in Utah and lasted until April 25, 2016.

Release
The Weinstein Company acquired the distribution rights on May 13, 2016, during the 2016 Cannes Film Festival. In January 2017, it was announced that the company would no longer distribute the film, but the distribution deal was later finalized. It had a limited release on August 4, 2017, before going wide on August 18.

In October 2017, following reporting on the Harvey Weinstein sexual abuse scandal, Lionsgate announced that it would distribute the film on home media and streaming services. The Weinstein Company (TWC) name and logo were omitted from the credits, trailer, and packaging. As a result, The Weinstein Company finally stopped distributing the film. Sheridan had required that TWC be deleted from the materials, and demanded that all money Weinstein would have made on this work be donated to charity.

Reception

Box office
Wind River grossed $33.8 million in the United States and Canada and $11.2 million in other territories for a worldwide total of $45 million, against a production budget of $11 million.

In the film's limited opening weekend, it made $161,558 from four theaters (a per-location average of $40,390, one of the best of 2017), finishing 29th at the box office. In its second week, the film expanded to 45 theaters and grossed $622,567. The film expanded to 694 theaters on August 18 and grossed $3 million, finishing tenth at the box office. The following week the film was added to an additional 1,401 theaters (for a total of 2,095) and made $4.6 million (an increase of 54.6%), finishing fourth at the box office. The film opened in another 507 theaters and made $5.7 million the following weekend, and an estimated $7.2 million over the four-day Labor Day weekend, finishing in the second spot at the U.S. box office consistently for the next 13 days. It was the sixth-highest grossing indie film of 2017.

Critical response
On review aggregator website Rotten Tomatoes, the film has an approval rating of 88% based on 249 reviews, with an average rating of 7.67/10. The website's critical consensus reads, "Wind River lures viewers into a character-driven mystery with smart writing, a strong cast, and a skillfully rendered setting that delivers the bitter chill promised by its title." On Metacritic, the film has a weighted average score of 73 out of 100, based on 44 critics, indicating "generally favorable reviews". Audiences polled by PostTrak gave the film a 90% overall positive score and a 70% "definite recommend".

Owen Gleiberman of Variety described Wind River as a "humanistic crime drama, though this one has more skill than excitement". Chris Plante of The Verge described it as "a thrilling, violent finale to the Hell or High Water and Sicario trilogy", and as "Coen brothers noir meets the case of the week."

Writing for Rolling Stone, Peter Travers praised Sheridan's direction and the cast, giving the film 3/4 stars. He wrote: "[It's] the set-up for what could have been a conventional whodunit – thankfully, Sheridan is allergic to all things conventional. To him, the action is character, and he's lucked out by finding actors who not only understand his approach but thrive on it." David Ehrlich of IndieWire gave the film a B, writing: "[If] Wind River shares Sheridan’s self-evident weaknesses, it also makes the most of his signature strengths. [...] Wind River may not blow you away, but this bitter, visceral, and almost paradoxically intense thriller knows what it takes to survive."

In a High Country News article titled "Why do white writers keep making films about Indian Country?", Native commentator Jason Asenap praises the film as "a thinking-person's thriller" full of complex characters, and describes the film's focus on missing Native American women as "admirable." He criticizes the film for perpetuating the "dying Indians" motif: 
"at least in Hollywood, the Indians die. To this day, the Indians die, and not just physically, but culturally. Simpson and Sheridan are invested in making us see how America has screwed Native people, but to the point of rubbing it in our faces. Is it so terrible to live in one’s own homeland? It may be hard to get out, but it certainly feels condescending for a non-Native to write as much."

The filmmakers were criticized for casting non-Native actors in some of the Native American roles. Kelsey Chow had been advertised as Eastern Band Cherokee, leading the Eastern Band Cherokee to issue a statement that she is neither an enrolled member nor descended from the tribe.

Accolades

Sequel
In November 2022, Kari Skogland signed on to direct a sequel titled Wind River: The Next Chapter, from a screenplay by Patrick Massett and John Zinman, and starring Martin Sensmeier. Principal photography is set to take place from March 15 to April 24, 2023 in Calgary.

Notes

References

External links 
 
 
 
 
 
 Wind River at The Numbers

2017 films
2017 Western (genre) films
2010s mystery thriller films
American Western (genre) films
American mystery thriller films
Films about Native Americans
Films about rape in the United States
Films about the Federal Bureau of Investigation
Films directed by Taylor Sheridan
Films produced by Peter Berg
Films produced by Basil Iwanyk
Films scored by Nick Cave
Films scored by Warren Ellis (musician)
Films set in Wyoming
Films shot in Utah
Films with screenplays by Taylor Sheridan
Neo-Western films
Thunder Road Films films
Voltage Pictures films
Wind River Indian Reservation
Women in Wyoming
2010s English-language films
2010s American films
Casting controversies in film
Race-related controversies in film
Native American-related controversies in film